Lalton Kalan is a village in Ludhiana city. It is specially known for the people from Grewal caste (Jat people). It is a village located in the Ludhiana South tehsil, of Ludhiana district, Punjab.

Administration
The village is administered by a Sarpanch who is an elected representative of village as per constitution of India and Panchayati raj (India).

Air travel connectivity 
The closest airport to the village is Sahnewal Airport.

References

Villages in Ludhiana district